Charles 'Charlie' Roger Backhouse (1871 – 5 August 1925) was an Australian rules footballer who played in the VFA for Carlton Football Club in 1890 and between 1891 and 1905 for the Richmond Football Club.

He was Captain of the Club in 1893 and played in the club's inaugural VFA Premiership side in 1902. In all he played 210 games for Richmond and kicked 42 goals. He also served on the Richmond Football Club Committee in 1894, 1900 and 1902.

He was made a life member of the Richmond Football Club in 1904 and was inducted into the club's Hall of Fame in its inaugural year, 2002.

References

External links

1871 births
1925 deaths
Carlton Football Club (VFA) players
Richmond Football Club (VFA) players
Australian rules footballers from Melbourne
People from South Melbourne